Ahmed Soilihi (born 1 July 1996) is a professional footballer who plays as a defender for Championnat National 2 club Martigues. Born in France, he represents the Comoros at international level.

Club career 
Soilihi was trained in the youth academy of Istres, and moved to Athlético Marseille in the summer of 2017. In July 2020, he signed for Championnat National side Quevilly-Rouen. In January 2022, Soilihi joined Championnat National 2 side Martigues.

International career 
Soilihi made his professional debut for the Comoros national team in a 1–0 friendly win over Mauritania on 6 October 2017.

References

External links 
 
 
 Comoros Football Profile
 

1996 births
Living people
People from Istres
Sportspeople from Bouches-du-Rhône
Association football defenders
Comorian footballers
French sportspeople of Comorian descent
Comoros international footballers
French footballers
Championnat National players
Championnat National 2 players
Championnat National 3 players
FC Istres players
Athlético Marseille players
US Quevilly-Rouen Métropole players
FC Martigues players
Footballers from Provence-Alpes-Côte d'Azur